The Wellesley College Senate bus is a shuttle bus service that connects Wellesley College to the Massachusetts Institute of Technology and Harvard University.

History 
Until November 1966, transportation at Wellesley consisted of a shuttle to the Woodland MBTA Green Line stop in the nearby city of Newton. At this point, college president Ruth Adams approved expansion of the transportation system and the Senate bus began operations. The shuttle service was originally named for the Wellesley College Student Government Senate, which lobbied in favor of such a route. Author Susan Orlean noted that the weekend bus was viewed by some students as a sign of liberation, in that there was a time earlier in that century when students were confined to campus on weekends unless they had a note from home.

Service 
The Senate bus is operated by the Wellesley College Department of Housing and Transportation, running Friday through Sunday every week. After leaving Wellesley, stops are made at Harvard Square, MIT's Kresge Auditorium, and Commonwealth Avenue in Boston.

The service is not to be confused with the "exchange bus", which transfers employees, faculty, and cross-registered students between MIT and Wellesley during the week.

Other transport alternatives exist.

Media coverage as the "Fuck Truck"
Students at MIT, Harvard, and Wellesley have sometimes referred to the shuttle service as the "Fuck Truck". The term gained national notoriety when it was mentioned in a 2001 Rolling Stone article entitled "The Highly Charged Erotic Life of the Wellesley Girl", which also discussed the supposed sexual eagerness of Wellesley students. This article and other media attention given to the bus and Wellesley's party scene in general caused concern among the college's administration.

A 1995 Boston Herald article also discussed the Senate Bus in terms that many Wellesley students found sensationalistic. An article in Counterpoint magazine criticized both the Herald article and the Wellesley student government response to it:
"In actuality, the bus is the only affordable means of transportation into the Boston area for many Wellesley students during the weekends. Many women riding the Senate Bus have more critical concerns than Saturday evening socializing."

At least one survey suggests that the sexually promiscuous image of Wellesley students that these articles put forth may be exaggerated. In its November 2001 sex survey, Counterpoint reported that 14% of Wellesley students who had had sex claimed to have engaged in sex with an MIT student, and 19% of MIT students who had had sex claimed to have engaged in sex with a Wellesley student. It also reported that 60% of Wellesley students were virgins, as were 47% of MIT students; in addition, 31% of Wellesley students and 43% of MIT students reported having had sex while in college.

A poem mentioning the bus appeared in the May 1995 issue of the poetry magazine Xconnect.

An article discussing the bus and its role in Wellesley's social life appeared in the February 22, 2006 issue of The Harvard Crimson.  This article referred to the bus as the "Cuddle Shuttle" and "Fuck Truck" and did not use the shuttle's official name.

The bus is mentioned in The Accidental Billionaires by Ben Mezrich, and appears to be shown on screen in the movie based on the book, The Social Network. The book incorrectly describes it as "a vanlike bus that traveled between the Harvard campus and a half dozen of the nearby all-girl schools—as well as a few of the more liberal-minded coed party campuses."

In addition to this "serious" media attention, Harvard's student-published humor magazines have occasionally mentioned the bus, referring to it as the "Fuck Truck".

Uses of "fuck truck" and similar terms at colleges across America 
A bus referred to as the "fuck truck" by The Bi-College News of Haverford and Bryn Mawr connects the following campuses: 
 Swarthmore, Bryn Mawr, and Haverford
 Yale and Quinnipiac

References 

W
Massachusetts Institute of Technology
Massachusetts Institute of Technology student life
University and college bus systems
Wellesley College
1966 establishments in Massachusetts
Bus transportation in the Boston area
Transportation in Cambridge, Massachusetts